James Elliott Dougherty (born March 8, 1968) is an American former professional baseball pitcher. He played in Major League Baseball (MLB) from 1995 to 1999 for the Houston Astros, Oakland Athletics, and Pittsburgh Pirates.

Amateur career
A native of Brentwood, New York, Dougherty attended Ross High School and the University of North Carolina at Chapel Hill. In 1988 and 1989, he played collegiate summer baseball in the Cape Cod Baseball League for the Yarmouth-Dennis Red Sox. He was selected by the Astros in the 26th round of the 1990 MLB Draft.

Professional career
In a four-season MLB career, Dougherty posted an 8–4 record with a 5.99 ERA, 59 strikeouts, and 94⅔ innings without saves in 79 games.

See also
1989 College World Series

References

External links

1968 births
Living people
Altoona Curve players
American expatriate baseball players in Canada
Asheville Tourists players
Baseball players from New York (state)
Edmonton Trappers players
Houston Astros players
Jackson Generals (Texas League) players
Las Vegas 51s players
Major League Baseball pitchers
Memphis Redbirds players
Nashville Sounds players
Norfolk Tides players
North Carolina Tar Heels baseball players
Oakland Athletics players
Osceola Astros players
People from Brentwood, New York
Pittsburgh Pirates players
Tucson Toros players
Yarmouth–Dennis Red Sox players
Sportspeople from Suffolk County, New York